The State Reserve Bureau also known as State Bureau of Material Reserve was part of the National Development and Reform Commission of the government of China.

The bureau was responsible for managing strategic material reserves such as copper, iron, etc. and managing funds, assets, infrastructure, etc. It also manages trading in material reserves such as metals.

The bureau gained attention within the press in 2005 when a rogue trader vanished for some time as part of the State Reserves Bureau copper scandal.

References

External links 
 Official website 

Economic development in China
Investment promotion agencies
National Development and Reform Commission